MTUC may refer to:

 Malaysian Trades Union Congress
 Mauritius Trade Union Congress